Benjamin Bertrand (born 24 June 1992) is a French retired professional footballer who played as a goalkeeper.

Career

Tours
Bertrand went through various academies, including those of Real Sociedad, Girondins Bordeaux, and Tours FC. From the latter, he eventually managed to break into professional football, making his Ligue 2 debut on 1 August 2014 against US Créteil-Lusitanos in a 4–2 home win. Bertrand was occasionally also used in the second team providing him with game time. After the 2014–15 season, his contract did not get extended.

Young Lions
After being a free agent for the first half of the 2015–16 season, he signed a six-month contract with Singaporean side Young Lions, for the 2016 S.League season, making him the highest paid player on the team. He made his debut in the fourth game of the season, helping his new side to a more respectable score-line against nine times champions Warriors FC. After the 2016 S.League season ended, Bertrand decided to not extend his contract, deciding for a return to Europe.

Return to Europe
Since his return to Europe, Bertrand has remained a free agent, attracting a variety of teams. He has been on trial with French Ligue 2 team Sochaux-Montbéliard.

Francs Borains
After several trials with various clubs, Bertrand signed with Belgian Third Amateur Division club Francs Borains on 29 January 2018 until the end of the season.

Pau FC
On 15 July 2019, and after being a free agent for one year, Bertrand signed a contract with Championnat National club Pau FC. On 16 November 2019, he made his debut for the club, in a 1–0 victory over FC Alberes Argelès, in the seventh round of the Coupe de France. On 16 January 2020, Bertrand was given game time in the round of 32 of the Coupe de France against Girondins Bordeaux, in which Pau sensationally won 3–2 after extra-time. On 8 January 2021, Bertrand gave his league debut in a 3–1 defeat against Chambly. He decided to retire from professional football at the end of the 2021–22 season.

Career statistics

Club

References

Living people
1992 births
Association football goalkeepers
French footballers
Ligue 2 players
Championnat National players
Championnat National 3 players
Singapore Premier League players
Tours FC players
Young Lions FC players
Pau FC players
French expatriate footballers
Francs Borains players